Diemaco was a Canadian defence company based in Kitchener, Ontario, Canada, that manufactured the C7 family of rifles under a licence from Colt. It was acquired by Colt Defense on May 20, 2005, in an $18.2 million purchase from parent company Héroux-Devtek Inc, which had purchased Diemaco in 2000.

References

Firearm manufacturers of Canada
Companies based in Kitchener, Ontario
History of manufacturing in Ontario
Industrial history of the Regional Municipality of Waterloo